The following radio stations broadcast on AM frequency 1430 kHz: 1430 AM is a regional broadcast frequency, as classified by the U.S. Federal Communications Commission and the Canadian Radio-television and Telecommunications Commission.

Argentina
 LRI235 in Balcarce, Buenos Aires
 LT24 in San Nicolas de los Arroyos, Buenos Aires
 LV26 in Rio Tercero, Cordoba

Canada
 CHKT in Toronto, Ontario - 50 kW, transmitter located at

Guatemala (Channel 90)
TGAG in Huehuetenango

Mexico
 XETT-AM in Tlaxcala City, Tlaxcala
 XEWD-AM in Ciudad Miguel Alemán, Tamaulipas

United States

Uruguay
CW-25 in Durazno, Durazno.

References

Lists of radio stations by frequency